Dr. Keith  Christian is Professor of Zoology at Charles Darwin University where he teaches in the School of Environmental & Life Sciences.

He is a specialist in the physiology of amphibians and reptiles.

External links
Charles Darwin University profile

Year of birth missing (living people)
Living people
Academic staff of Charles Darwin University
Australian zoologists
Place of birth missing (living people)